Lucius Volcatius Tullus was a Roman politician who was elected consul in 33 BC.

Biography
Tullus was the son of Lucius Volcatius Tullus, the consul of 66 BC. Elected praetor urbanus in 46 BC, in 45 BC he was allotted the province of Cilicia for his propraetoral governorship, which he held until 44 BC. His decision not to give aid to Gaius Antistius Vetus, the governor of Syria, allowed Quintus Caecilius Bassus, the former governor and opponent of Julius Caesar, to hold out until the Parthians were able to reach Bassus.

Tullus subsequently was elected consul in 33 BC. He later was proconsul in Asia either from 28 to 27 BC, or from 27 to 26 BC.

Notes

Sources

Primary sources
 Appian, Illyr. 27.
 Cassius Dio xlix. 43.
 Cicero ad Familiares xiii. 41.

Secondary sources
 

1st-century BC Roman consuls
Roman governors of Cilicia
Roman governors of Asia
Tullus, Lucius